Ferrer may refer to:

Generic

Ferrer (surname)

People surnamed Ferrer or de Ferrer

Ada Ferrer (born 1962), American historian
Albert Ferrer (born 1970), Spanish footballer
Alex Ferrer, judge in the courtroom television show Judge Alex
Concepció Ferrer (born 1938), Spanish academic and politician
Danay Ferrer (born 1974)
David Ferrer (born 1982), Spanish tennis player
Darien Ferrer (born 1983), Cuban volleyball player 
Dennis Ferrer, American music producer and DJ
Eduardo Blasco Ferrer (born 1956), Spanish-born specialist in the Sardinian language
Fernando Ferrer (born 1950), American politician
Francesc Ferrer i Guàrdia (1859–1909), Catalan educator, anarchist, and free-thinker who founded the Escuela Moderna
Frank Ferrer, American rock drummer and session musician
Héctor Altuve Ferrer
Horacio Ferrer (born 1933) Uruguayan poet, broadcaster, reciter and tango lyricist
Ibrahim Ferrer (1927–2005), Cuban musician, Buena Vista Social Club
Jaume Ferrer, (fl. 1346), Majorcan sailor who explored the West African coast 
Javier Justiz Ferrer (born 1992), Cuban basketball player 
Jorge Ferrer, author
José Ferrer (1909–1992), Puerto Rican actor and film director
José Ferrer (guitarist) (1835–1916), Spanish guitarist and composer
Josep Ferrer i Bujons (born 1959), Catalan writer, poet, and linguist
José Ferrer Selma (born 1950), Spanish footballer
José Figueres Ferrer (1906–1990), three-time President of Costa Rica
José Joaquín de Ferrer (1763-1818), Spanish astronomer
Julio Ferrer (1953–2022), Puerto Rican Olympic sprinter
Kevin Ferrer (born 1993), Filipino basketball player
Llorenç Serra Ferrer (born 1953), Spanish football manager
Luis Ladaria Ferrer (born 1944), Spanish prelate, Vatican official 
Lupita Ferrer (born 1947), Venezuelan telenovela actress
Manuel Y. Ferrer, American guitarist
Maria Teresa Ferrer i Mallol (1940-2017), Catalan historian
Marina Ferrer, fictional character of The L Word
Mel Ferrer (1917–2008), American actor, film director, and film producer
Mercedes Ferrer (born 1963), Spanish singer-songwriter
Miguel Ferrer (disambiguation)
Miguel Ferrer (1955–2017), Puerto Rican-American actor
Miriam Coronel-Ferrer, Filipino peace negotiator 
Nino Ferrer (1934–1998), French-Italian singer, actor, and jazz musician
Pepita Ferrer Lucas (1938–1993), Spanish chess master
Renée Ferrer de Arréllaga (born 1944), Paraguayan poet and novelist
Séverine Ferrer (born 1977), French singer
Sonia Ferrer (born 1977), Spanish model and TV presenter
Suzi Ferrer (1940–2006) US/Puerto Rican visual artist and feminist
Thays Ferrer )born 1999), Brazilian womern's footballer
Tony Ferrer (1934-2021), Filipino actor, film director, and producer 
Vincent Ferrer (1350–1419), Valencian Dominican missionary and Roman Catholic saint
Ysa Ferrer (born 1972), Algerian-born French actress and singer

Places

Church of St. Vincent Ferrer (New York)
Misión San Vicente Ferrer
Two parishes in Brazil called São Vicente Ferrer (Portuguese for Saint Vincent Ferrer):
São Vicente Ferrer, Pernambuco
São Vicente Ferrer, Maranhão

Other

Ferrer Schools, or Modern Schools, socially progressive American schools formed in the early 20th century after the model of Francisco Ferrer's Escuela Moderna

See also

 Christy Ferer, U.S. philanthropist
 Ferr
 
 
 Ferrers (disambiguation)
 Ferrier (disambiguation)
 Fer (disambiguation)